The Sonic Boom Over Europe Tour (full title: Sonic Boom Over Europe: From the Beginning to the Boom) was a concert tour by American rock band Kiss in support of their 19th studio album Sonic Boom, which was released in October 2009.

The tour started in Sheffield, United Kingdom at the Sheffield Arena in early May and concluded at the Graspop Metal Meeting Festival in Dessel, Belgium in late June. The leg marked the band's first tour of indoor arenas in the United Kingdom since 1996, their first show in Ireland since 1988, and their debut concert in Slovakia. The group performed at a number of music festivals on the tour, including the Rock am Ring and Rock im Park Festivals, Sauna Open Air Metal Festival and Hellfest.

Each show was recorded and sold to fans on a USB flash drive following the concert.

Before the start of the tour, the group played a promotional show at the Islington Academy in London on March 2, 2010 to about 800 people. Three songs had to be cut from the 15-song set due to issues with the CO2 canisters used to release confetti during "Rock and Roll All Nite".

A subsequent tour entitled The Hottest Show on Earth Tour followed in late July 2010, reaching North American markets.

In the tour program for the band's final tour, Singer reflected on the tour:

Setlist

The setlist featured three songs from Sonic Boom: "Modern Day Delilah", "Say Yeah" and "I'm an Animal". Also included was "Crazy Crazy Nights", performed live for the first time since the Hot in the Shade Tour in 1990. Beginning with the date in Hamburg, Germany, "Beth" was added to the setlist. It was the first time the song was performed live since the World Domination Tour in 2003 and the first time it was performed acoustically since Kiss' appearance on MTV Unplugged in 1995.

Tour dates

References

External links
KissOnline.com

Kiss (band) concert tours
2010 concert tours